Israel competed at the 2016 Winter Youth Olympics in Lillehammer, Norway from 12 to 21 February 2016.

Alpine skiing

Boys

Figure skating

Singles

See also
Israel at the 2016 Summer Olympics

References

2016 in Israeli sport
Nations at the 2016 Winter Youth Olympics
Israel at the Youth Olympics